Maestro de Campo, also called Sibale and Concepcion is an island in the province of Romblon, Philippines. Concepcion, a Philippine sixth class municipality is located on Maestro de Campo. In 1919, most of Maestro de Campo's residents were located in Concepcion.

See also

 List of islands of the Philippines

References

Islands of Romblon
Inactive volcanoes of the Philippines